The following is a list of spreadsheets.

Free and open-source software

Cloud and on-line spreadsheets 

 Collabora Online Calc — Enterprise-ready LibreOffice.
 Sheetster – "Community Edition" is available under the Affero GPL
 Simple Spreadsheet
 Tiki Wiki CMS Groupware includes a spreadsheet since 2004 and migrated to jQuery.sheet in 2010.

Spreadsheets that are parts of suites 
 Apache OpenOffice Calc — for MS Windows, Linux and the Apple Macintosh. Started as StarOffice, later as OpenOffice.org. It has not received a major update since 2014 and security fixes have not been prompt.
 Collabora Online Calc — Enterprise-ready LibreOffice, included with Online, Mobile and Desktop apps
 Gnumeric — for Linux.  Started as the GNOME desktop spreadsheet.  Reasonably lightweight but has very advanced features.
 KSpread — following the fork of the Calligra Suite from KOffice in mid-2010, superseded by KCells in KOffice and Sheets in the Calligra Suite.
 LibreOffice Calc — developed for MS Windows, Linux, BSD and Apple Macintosh (Mac) operating systems by The Document Foundation.  The Document Foundation was formed in mid-2010 by several large organisations such as Google, Red Hat, Canonical (Ubuntu) and Novell along with the OpenOffice.org community (developed by Sun) and various OpenOffice.org forks, notably Go-oo.  Go-oo had been the "OpenOffice" used in Ubuntu and elsewhere.  Started as StarOffice in the late 1990s, it became OpenOffice under Sun and then LibreOffice in mid-2010.  The Document Foundation works with external organisations such as NeoOffice and Apache Foundation to help drive all three products forward.
 NeoOffice Calc — for Mac.  Started as an OpenOffice.org port to Mac, but by using the Mac-specific Aqua user interface, instead of the more widely used X11 windowing server, it aimed to be far more stable than the normal ports of other suites.
 Siag — for Linux, OpenBSD and Apple Mac OS X.  A simple old spreadsheet, part of Siag Office.
 Sheets — for MS Windows, Linux, FreeBSD, Apple Mac OS X and Haiku.  Part of the extensive Calligra Suite.  Possibly still mainly for Linux, but ports have been developed for other operating systems.

Standalone spreadsheets 
 sc
 GNU Oleo
 Pyspread

Proprietary software

Online spreadsheets 
 EditGrid – access, collaborate and share spreadsheets online, with API support; discontinued since 2014
Google Sheets – as part of Google Workspace
 Zoho Sheet Spreadsheet on the cloud that allows real-time collaboration and more, for free
 iRows – closed since 31 December 2006
 JotSpot Tracker – acquired by Google Inc.
 Smartsheet – Online spreadsheet for project management, interactive Gantt, file sharing, integrated with Google Apps
 ThinkFree Online Calc – as part of the ThinkFree Office online office suite, using Java
 Airtable – a spreadsheet-database hybrid, with the features of a database but applied to a spreadsheet.

Spreadsheets that are parts of suites 
 Ability Office Spreadsheet – for MS Windows.
 Apple iWork Numbers, included with Apple's iWork '08 suite exclusively for Mac OS X v10.4 or higher.
 AppleWorks – for MS Windows and Macintosh. This is a further development of the historical Claris Works Office suite.
 WordPerfect Office Quattro Pro – for MS Windows. Was one of the big three spreadsheets (the others being Lotus 123 and Excel).
 EasyOffice EasySpreadsheet – for MS Windows. No longer freeware, this suite aims to be more user friendly than competitors.
 Framework – for MS Windows. Historical office suite still available and supported.  It includes a spreadsheet.
 Google Sheets – as part of Google Workspace suite, supporting both offline and online editing.
 IBM Lotus Symphony – freeware for MS Windows, Apple Mac OS X and Linux.
 Kingsoft Office Spreadsheets 2012 – For MS Windows. Both free and paid versions are available. It can handle Microsoft Excel .xls and .xlsx files, and also produce other file formats such as .et, .txt, .csv, .pdf, and .dbf. It supports multiple tabs, VBA macro and PDF converting.
 Lotus SmartSuite Lotus 123 – for MS Windows.  In its MS-DOS (character cell) version, widely considered to be responsible for the explosion of popularity of spreadsheets during the 80s and early 90s.
 Microsoft Office Excel – for MS Windows and Apple Macintosh. The proprietary spreadsheet leader.
 Microsoft Works Spreadsheet – for MS Windows (previously MS-DOS and Apple Macintosh). Only allows one sheet at a time.
 PlanMaker – for MS Windows, Linux, MS Windows Mobile and CE; part of SoftMaker Office
 Quattro Pro – part of WordPerfect Office
 StarOffice Calc – Cross-platform. StarOffice was originally developed by the German company Star Division which was purchased by Sun in 1998.  The code was made open source and became OpenOffice.org.  Sun continues developing the commercial version which periodically integrates the open source code with their own and third party code to make new low price versions.

Stand alone spreadsheets 
 As-Easy-As – from Trius, Inc.; unsupported; last MS-DOS and Windows versions available with free full license key.

Multi-dimensional spreadsheets 
 Javelin
 Lotus Improv
 Quantrix Financial Modeler

Spreadsheets on different paradigms 

 DADiSP – Combines the numerical capability of MATLAB with a spreadsheet like interface.
 Javelin
 Lotus Improv
 Resolver One – a business application development tool that represents spreadsheets as IronPython programs, created and executed in real time and allowing the spreadsheet flow to be fully programmed
 Spreadsheet 2000

Spreadsheet-related developmental software 
 ExtenXLS – Java Spreadsheet Toolkit.

Specifications 

-* 32-bit addressable memory on Microsoft Windows, i.e. ~2.5 GB.

Historical 
In chronologial order, year launched, product, launched for which machine/OS.
 1979, VisiCalc for Apple II with 32K RAM, the first widely used normal spreadsheet with A1 notation etc.
 1980, SuperCalc for CP/M-80 operating system, included with early Osborne computers.
 1982, ZX81 Memocalc, for low cost ~$100 personal computer with 16K RAM expansion, launched by Memotech in April 1982.
 1982, Multiplan for CP/M operating system, later becoming Microsoft Excel, launched Aug 1982.
 1983, Lotus 1-2-3 for DOS operating system, the first killer application of the IBM personal computer, it took the market from Visicalc in the early 1980s.
 1983, Dynacalc for OS-9 a Unix-like operating system, similar to VisiCalc.
 1984, Lotus Symphony for DOS operating system, the follow-on to Lotus 1-2-3
 1985, Boeing Calc for MVS a Unix-like operating system and DOS operating system, written by subsidiary of aviation manufacturer Boeing.
 1985, StarOffice for DOS operating system, later becoming OpenOffice.org then currently LibreOffice and Collabora Online.
 1985, 20/20, for DOS operating system, competitor to 1-2-3 with database integration, real-time data updating, multiplatform.
 1986, VP Planner for DOS operating system, similar in look and feel to Lotus 1-2-3, but included 5 level multi-dimensional database
 1988, Wingz for Classic Mac OS operating system, a multi dimensional Spreadsheet from Informix.
 1991, 3D-Calc for Atari ST operating system, multi-dimensional spreadsheet
 1991, Lotus Improv for NeXTSTEP operating system, novel design that went beyond A1 notation.

See also 
 Comparison of spreadsheets
 Logical spreadsheet

References 

Spreadsheets